Ophryotrocha scutellus, is a species of polychaete worm. Live observation of this species in aquarium experiments indicate a bacterial diet. O. scutellus is named after the Latin scutella for “saucer”, due to its flattened disc-like head. Ophryotrocha scutellus has a dorsoventrally rounded and flattened prostomium, similar to O. platykephale, from which this species differs in jaw morphology, the form of its parapodia and the absence of branchiae.

Description

Its body shape is elongated, with a uniform width for the majority of its length. It is transparent in colour, white eggs being visible in females. It lacks eyes; it possesses long, cirriform paired antennae, with palps being inserted lateroventrally on the prostomium. Its mandibles are rod-like, and lack serration. Its maxillae have seven pairs of free denticles. It counts with two peristomial segments without setae. It counts with a cirriform acicular lobe, its supraacicular chaetae being simple, while the subacicular chaetae are compound, and exhibit serrated blades. Its pygidium has a terminal anus, with two pygidial cirri that measure as long as its antennae and shows a short appendage ventrally.

Distribution

References

Further reading

Wiklund, Helena, et al. "Systematics and biodiversity of Ophryotrocha (Annelida, Dorvilleidae) with descriptions of six new species from deep-sea whale-fall and wood-fall habitats in the north-east Pacific." Systematics and Biodiversity 10.2 (2012): 243-259.
Taboada, Sergi, et al. "Two new Antarctic Ophryotrocha (Annelida: Dorvilleidae) described from shallow-water whale bones." Polar biology 36.7 (2013): 1031-1045.

External links

WORMS

Polychaetes